Oru Pudhiya Kadhai is a 1990 Indian Tamil-language romantic drama film directed by R. Balasubbiah, starring newcomer Prabhuraj and Meena. It was released on 10 August 1990.

Plot

Cast 
Prabhuraj
Meena
Bhavani

Production 
Meena, who starred as a child actress in several films, made her lead Tamil debut with this film. She gained recognition on the serial Anbulla Amma before acting in this film. Editor M. Rajaram of Dinamalar turned producer with this film.

Soundtrack 
Uma Kannadasan, who is not related to Kannadasan, composed the soundtrack and wrote the lyrics.

Reception 
N. Krishnaswamy of The Indian Express opined that "the director Balasubbiah, though he flounders off and on, has kept the fare clean". B. S. S. of Kalki criticised the film for not presenting a new story while noting that Uma Kannadasan's music sounds like Ilaiyaraaja's in places. The film was a commercial failure.

References

External links 
 

1990 romantic drama films
1990s Tamil-language films
Indian romantic drama films